Taj Maleki (also Romanized as Tāj Malekī and Tāj-e Malekī) is a village in Hayat Davud Rural District, in the Central District of Ganaveh County, Bushehr Province, Iran. At the 2006 census, its population was 32, in 10 families.

References 

Populated places in Ganaveh County